The Splügen Pass is an Alpine mountain pass of the Lepontine Alps.

Geography
The pass road connects the Swiss Hinterrhein valley and Splügen in the canton of Graubünden with the Valle San Giacomo and Chiavenna in the Italian province of Sondrio, the road continuing to Lake Como. The pass is the water divide between the drainage basins of the Rhine, which flows into the North Sea, and the Po, which flows into the Adriatic. The pass is overlooked by Pizzo Tambo and the Surettahorn, on its western and eastern side respectively. On the Italian side of the pass is Montespluga, a small three street village which is cut off from both Italy and Switzerland during the winter.

Since the opening of the San Bernardino road tunnel in 1967, the pass has lost its former importance; it is not kept open in winter. Thanks to its lack of importance, it is now a quiet pass where essential portions of the historical roads have survived allowing a good historical review for hikers on the Via Spluga.

History 
The pass was already in use in the Roman era. It possibly corresponds to Cunus Aureus shown on the Tabula Peutingeriana (which may alternatively have referred to the Julier Pass). The name Splügen itself is possibly derived from specula ("lookout"). In the Middle Ages, the Bishops of Chur had the trade route relocated to Septimer Pass.

From 1818 to 1823 the modern road was built at the behest of the Austrian authorities, then ruling the Kingdom of Lombardy–Venetia in the south. In 1840, author Mary Shelley traveled through the pass on the way to Lake Como with her son. She describes the pass in her travel narrative, Rambles in Germany and Italy, published in 1844:

Plans to build a railroad line across Splügen Pass were abandoned in favour of the Gotthard railway opened in 1882.

The Pass is also mentioned in Arthur Conan Doyle's "The Adventure of the Illustrious Client", a Sherlock Holmes short story of 1924. The Austrian Baron Adalbert Grüner, the villain of the story, murdered his wife by throwing her from the Pass, although Holmes cannot prove it.

See also
 List of highest paved roads in Europe
 List of mountain passes
List of the highest Swiss passes

Bibliography
 Nicola Pfund, Sui passi in bicicletta - Swiss Alpine passes by bicycle, Fontana Edizioni, 2012, p. 140-145.

References

External links

History
Gradient of the road from Splügen
Gradient of the road from Chiavenna

Mountain passes of the Alps
Mountain passes of Italy
Mountain passes of Switzerland
Italy–Switzerland border crossings
Valle Spluga
Landforms of Lombardy
Mountain passes of Graubünden
Transport in Lombardy
Lepontine Alps
Rheinwald